Mike Zele (born July 3, 1956) is a former American football defensive tackle. He played for the Atlanta Falcons from 1979 to 1983.

References

1956 births
Living people
American football defensive tackles
Kent State Golden Flashes football players
Atlanta Falcons players